Stan Cho (born September 14, 1977) is a Canadian politician, who was elected to the Legislative Assembly of Ontario in the 2018 provincial election. He represents the riding of Willowdale as a member of the Progressive Conservative Party of Ontario. He currently serves as the Associate Minister of Transportation focusing on delivering transit-oriented communities.

Background 
Cho was born in Etobicoke, Ontario to an immigrant family from South Korea. They moved to the Willowdale neighbourhood of North York when Cho was eight years old. He holds a degree in philosophy from Trinity College at the University of Toronto. He began his career as an auditor for Mercedes-Benz before entering his family's real estate business. Cho worked as an agent for fifteen years before taking over as broker and general manager of their Royal LePage franchise in 2012.

Politics 
In 2018, Cho defeated Liberal incumbent David Zimmer, becoming MPP of the Willowdale riding.  Cho served as parliamentary assistant to the president of the Treasury Board, Minister Peter Bethlenfalvy. In the same year, Cho reintroduced Garrett's Legacy Act to the provincial legislature.

In 2019, Cho was appointed as the Parliamentary Assistant to the Minister of Finance, Rod Phillips.

Before becoming appointed as the Associate Minister of Transportation in June 2021, his Bill 262 (Convenience Store Week Act) received Royal Assent which proclaims the week before Labour Day as Convenience Store Week in Ontario.

Election results

References

1977 births
Canadian politicians of Korean descent
Living people
People from Etobicoke
People from North York
Politicians from Toronto
Progressive Conservative Party of Ontario MPPs
21st-century Canadian politicians